Astounding Hero Tales is a fiction anthology edited by James Lowder and published by Hero Games in March 2007.

Contents
"Death was silent" (Lester Dent)
"The mask of Kukulcan" (Will Murray)
"Two-fisted crookback" (Steve Melisi)
"Wolf train west" (William Messner-Loebs)
"Godmother" (Steve Eller)
"Missing pages" (Richard Dansky)
"Running thunder" (John Helfers)
"Playback" (Patricia Lee Macomber)
"A lost city of the jungle" (Darrell Schweitzer)
"It came from the swamp" (Ed Greenwood)
"Slide home" (David Niall Wilson)
"Out west" (John Pelan)
"Bandit gold" (Thomas M. Reid)
"Kiss me deadly" (Robert Weinberg)
"The forgotten man" (Robin D. Laws)
"House of shadows" (Hugh B. Cave)

Awards
Astounding Hero Tales won the 2007 Origins Award for Best Fiction Publication of the Year.

Reception
The anthology was reviewed by Scott Connors in Weird Tales, March-April 2008, and Jackson Kuhl in Black Gate, Summer 2008.

References

2007 anthologies
Works based on role-playing games